Fish River Seaplane Base  is a public-use seaplane base on Fish River in Baldwin County, Alabama, United States. The facility is located nine nautical miles (10 mi, 17 km) southeast of the central business district of Fairhope, Alabama. It has one seaplane landing area designated 16W/34W which measures 4,395 by 200 feet (1,340 x 61 m).

See also 
 H. L. Sonny Callahan Airport
 List of airports in Alabama

References

External links 

 Aerial image as of 16 February 1997 from USGS The National Map

Airports in Baldwin County, Alabama
Seaplane bases in the United States